The women's 50 metre freestyle S13 event at the 2012 Paralympic Games took place on 1 September, at the London Aquatics Centre.

Two heats were held, one with seven swimmers and one with eight competitors. The swimmers with the eight fastest times advanced to the final.

Heats

Final

References

Swimming at the 2012 Summer Paralympics
2012 in women's swimming